Douglas Hemphill Elliott (June 3, 1921 – June 19, 1960) was a Republican member of the U.S. House of Representatives from Pennsylvania.

Early life and education 
Elliott was born in Philadelphia, Pennsylvania. He attended the schools of Philadelphia and graduated from the Haverford School in 1938. He attended the University of Virginia from 1938 to 1940.

Career 
During World War II, Elliott served in the United States Navy from 1941 until he was discharged as a chief petty officer in 1945. He worked for insurance companies from 1945 to 1952. Elliott served as director of public relations of the Franklin Institute in Philadelphia from 1950 to 1952. He served as vice president of Wilson College in Chambersburg, Pennsylvania, from 1952 to 1960. Elliott was elected to the Pennsylvania State Senate in 1956, and served until he was elected to the Eighty-sixth Congress to fill the vacancy caused by the death of Richard Simpson and served from April 26, 1960, until June 19, 1960.

Personal life 
On June 19, 1960, Elliott committed suicide by carbon monoxide poisoning in Horse Valley, Pennsylvania, on June 19, 1960.

See also
 List of United States Congress members who died in office (1950–99)

References

Republican Party Pennsylvania state senators
United States Navy personnel of World War II
1921 births
1960 deaths
American Presbyterians
People from Chambersburg, Pennsylvania
American politicians who committed suicide
University of Virginia alumni
Wilson College (Pennsylvania)
Suicides by carbon monoxide poisoning
Suicides in Pennsylvania
Republican Party members of the United States House of Representatives from Pennsylvania
Politicians from Philadelphia
Burials in Pennsylvania
Haverford School alumni
20th-century American politicians
United States Navy chiefs
1960 suicides